American country music singer Miranda Lambert has released ten studio albums, one extended play, one video album, and has made 23 other album appearances. She has released 39 singles (including seven as a featured artist), nine promotional singles, and 37 music videos (including five guest appearances). Lambert has sold 7 million albums in the United States, with her first seven studio albums being certified platinum. In 2001, Lambert released a self-titled and self-financed independent album. After gaining exposure as the third-place winner of the television competition Nashville Star, Lambert signed with Epic Nashville in 2004.

Lambert's debut major-label album, Kerosene, was released in March 2005. Although its debut single, "Me and Charlie Talking", only reached 27 on the Billboard Hot Country Songs chart, the album debuted at number 1 on the Billboard Top Country Albums chart and 18 on the Billboard 200 list. The second single, entitled "Bring Me Down", was a second Top 40 hit. The release did not spawn a major hit until the title track was issued, peaking at number 15 on the Hot Country Songs chart, pressing the album to certify platinum in the United States. Her third album, Crazy Ex-Girlfriend, was released in May 2007, and also debuted at number 1 on the Top Country Albums chart, but peaked at number 6 on the Billboard 200 list. The title track was released as the lead single, but only peaked at number 50. The album's second single, "Famous in a Small Town", became her highest-peaking hit at that point, reaching number 14 in mid-2007. It was the third spawned single, entitled "Gunpowder & Lead", that yielded Lambert her first Top 10 hit on the Billboard Country Songs chart, peaking at number 7. The song's background and story yielded Crazy Ex-Girlfriend to certify gold in the United States in 2008, after selling 500,000 copies. The final single, "More Like Her", became her fourth Top 20 hit, after peaking at 17 in early 2009.

Revolution, was released in September 2009. It became Lambert's third release to debut at number 1 on the Billboard Top Country Albums chart, while also debuting at number 8 on the Billboard 200. The lead single, "Dead Flowers", was released in May 2009, and peaked within the Top 40. The album's second and third singles, "White Liar" and "The House That Built Me", have become her highest-charting singles to date. The final two singles from Revolution were "Only Prettier" and "Heart Like Mine", the latter has become Miranda's second number one hit. Her fifth studio album, Four the Record, was released in November 2011. The album produced five singles: "Baggage Claim", "Over You", "Fastest Girl in Town", "Mama's Broken Heart", and "All Kinds of Kinds". The first four singles reached the top 10 of the Billboard Hot Country Songs chart, with "Over You" becoming her third number one country single.

Lambert released her sixth studio album Platinum on June 3, 2014. The album debuted at number one on Billboard Top Country Albums as well as became her first number one on the Billboard 200 selling 180,000 copies in its first week. On the Top Country Albums chart, Lambert became the first artist to debut at number one on that chart with five consecutive albums. The album was met with widespread critical acclaim and earned her the Grammy Award for Best Country Album as well as a CMA Award and ACM Award in the same category. The album was certified platinum by the RIAA.

On November 18, 2016, Lambert released her seventh studio album titled The Weight of These Wings. It debuted at number three on the Billboard 200 and number one on Top Country albums chart selling 133,000 equivalent album units in its first week of release, becoming her sixth consecutive number one debut on the latter chart. She released her seventh studio album, Wildcard, on November 1, 2019. Wildcard became her seventh consecutive number-one album on the Top Country Albums chart, also reaching number four on the Billboard 200.

Studio albums

Extended plays

Singles

2000s

2010s–2020s

As featured artist

Promotional singles

Other charted songs

Videography

Video albums

Music videos

Guest appearances

Other album appearances

Notes

See also
Pistol Annies

References

External links
 Official Discography of Miranda Lambert
 [ Discography of Miranda Lambert] at Allmusic

Discography
Country music discographies
Discographies of American artists